Kaise Kahoon is an Indian soap opera telecast on the Hindi general entertainment channel, Zee TV in 2001. The series is produced by Mona Shourie Kapoor who is known from her earlier projects on DD National channel, and stars the Bollywood actor Rahul Roy in the main lead. The story revolves around two close friends from different communities whose friendship extends to their families. But due to certain misunderstandings and having opposing views in members of the two families, they begin to drift apart.

Concept
The plot tackles two main issues - a lesson on how people of different communities can live together peacefully and second about the role of women in society. The story portrays the lives of two best friends, Zahir Ahmed and Sudhir Sinha. Despite their trust and respect for each other, there are people who resent their friendship and want to drive a wedge between them.

Cast
Arun Govil as Zaheer Ahmed
Jayati Bhatia as Nasreen, Zaheer's wife
Sudhir Mitthoo as Sudhir Sinha
Rahul Roy as Feroze, Zaheer's brother who returns from abroad
Jaya Bhattacharya
Sudha Chandran
Vijayendra Ghatge
Phalguni Parekh
Rakesh Pandey
Bharti Jaffry
Mohan Joshi
Reema Lagoo
Anil Dhawan
Amita Nangia
Sadiya Siddiqui
Rijoy Anand
Ravi Kiren
Damini Kanwal

Reception
In UK, due to a quick ending of Kaise Kahoon, the viewers of Zee TV channel were really offended, and believed that the series was discontinued by the channel; however, in response, the channel said that the series was shown in full.

See also
Mona Shourie Kapoor

References

External links
Kaise Kahoon News Article
http://www.future-studio.net

Zee TV original programming
Indian television series
Indian television soap operas
2001 Indian television series debuts
2001 Indian television series endings